The fifteenth edition of the Johan Cruyff Shield was held on 31 July 2010 at the Amsterdam Arena. The match was played between the 2009–10 Eredivisie champions FC Twente and 2009–10 KNVB Cup winners Ajax. FC Twente won the match 1–0 with a goal from Luuk de Jong.

Match details

2010
Joh
j
j
Johan Cruyff Shield